Abdan Rural District is in Abdan District of Deyr County, Bushehr province, Iran. At the census of 2006, its population was 1,668 in 295 households, when it was in the Central District. There were 1,698 inhabitants in 377 households at the following census of 2011. At the most recent census of 2016, the population of the rural district was 954 in 247 households, by which time it had become a part of Abdan District. The largest of its 21 villages was Konar Torshan, with 230 people.

References 

Rural Districts of Bushehr Province
Populated places in Deyr County